Lorenzo Sgarbi (born 24 March 2001) is an Italian professional footballer who plays as a forward for  club Pro Sesto on loan from Napoli.

Club career
Born in Bolzano, Sgarbi joined to the Napoli youth system in 2017, on loan from Südtirol, and
permanently in 2019.

The forward was loaned to Legnago Salus for the 2020–21 Serie C season, and he made his professional debut on 26 September 2020 against Vis Pesaro. This loan was extended one year more.

On 11 July 2022, Sgarbi was loaned by Renate. On 12 January 2023, he moved on a new loan to Pro Sesto.

International career
Sgarbi was a youth international for Italy U18.

References

External links
 
 

2001 births
Living people
Sportspeople from Bolzano
Footballers from Trentino-Alto Adige/Südtirol
Italian footballers
Italy youth international footballers
Association football forwards
Serie C players
F.C. Südtirol players
S.S.C. Napoli players
F.C. Legnago Salus players
A.C. Renate players
S.S.D. Pro Sesto players